Isotomurus palustris, the marsh springtail, is a species of elongate-bodied springtail in the family Isotomidae. It is found in Europe, Africa, North America, and Central America.

References

External links

 

Collembola
Articles created by Qbugbot
Animals described in 1776
Taxa named by Otto Friedrich Müller